Sarotherodon linnellii, sometimes known as the unga, blackfin tilapia or blackbelly tilapia, is a cichlid endemic to Lake Barombi Mbo in western Cameroon.  This species reaches a length of  SL. It is critically endangered because of pollution and sedimentation due to human activities. It is potentially also threatened by large emissions of carbon dioxide (CO2) from the lake's bottom (compare Lake Nyos), although studies indicate that Barombo Mbo lacks excess amounts of this gas.

Juveniles mainly feed on insects (including their larvae) and adults mainly on phytoplankton.

The specific name honours a friend of Lönnberg’s, Gunnar Linnell, a Swede who owned a plantation in Cameroon and who sent a collection of fishes and crustaceans from there which included the type of this fish.

References

External links 

 Photograph

Endemic fauna of Cameroon
linnellii
Cichlid fish of Africa
Fish of Lake Barombi Mbo
Fish described in 1903